Moche is a Peruvian city, the capital of Moche District in Trujillo Province of La Libertad Region in northern Peru. It is located in the Moche Valley and was the center of development of the ancient Moche or Mochica culture. Now it is a major tourist destination of the Moche Route tourist circuit and It is part of the integrated area of Trujillo city.

Festivals

San Jose Festival, in Las Delicias beach.
Anniversary of Spanish foundation, celebrated in October of every year.

Tourism
Las Delicias beach
Huacas del Sol y de la Luna

See also
Moche culture
Trujillo
Valley of Moche
Countryside of Moche

References

External links
Map of Moche city
San Jose Festival

Multimedia
  in Trujillo city (Peru).
 

Cities in La Libertad Region
Localities of Trujillo, Peru